Saint-Hilaire-de-Clisson (literally Saint-Hilaire of Clisson) is a commune in the Loire-Atlantique department in western France.

See also
Communes of the Loire-Atlantique department

References

Sainthilairedeclisson